MS Albatros was a Royal Viking Star-class cruise ship, operated by the Germany-based travel agency Phoenix Reisen until 2020 when she was taken out of service, and scrapped in 2021.

History 
She was built in 1973 by Wärtsilä Helsinki Shipyard, Finland for Royal Viking Line as Royal Viking Sea, and has also sailed under the names Royal Odyssey for Royal Cruise Line, Norwegian Star for Norwegian Cruise Line, and Crown. She was the second Albatros for Phoenix Reisen as she was the replacement of the original . 

Albatros was also known for her -esque funnel. In October 2020 Albatros was sold as a hotel vessel for the Pick Albatros Group in the Middle East, which operates some 15 hotels and resorts in Hurghada region. However, the project was never initiated, and the ship stayed at Hurghada until sold in 2021 for scrap, after a stop in Jeddah. She was beached in Alang, India, on 27 July 2021. Scrapping on Albatros started on 17 November 2021. According to the NGO Robin des Bois, the Hotel Ship project was a trick to export the ship from Germany to India for scrapping.

References

Notes

Bibliography

External links

  Phoenix Reisen company website
  Fakta om Fartyg: M/S Royal Viking Sea (1973)
 Simplon Postcards: Royal Viking Sea
  Homepage of the TV-series Verrückt nach Meer

Cruise ships
Ships built in Helsinki
1973 ships